In Tibetan Buddhism and Bon, Menngagde, is the name of one of three scriptural and lineage divisions within Dzogchen (Great Perfection ).

Dzogchen is itself the pinnacle of the ninefold division of practice according to the Nyingma school of Tibetan Buddhism. Menngagde focuses on rigpa. The Menngagde or 'Instruction Class' of Dzogchen teachings are divided into two parts: trekchö and tögel.

Practice
For general purposes, Menngagde may also be known as Nyingthik. Germano & Gyatso (2000: p. 240) note a similarity of practice between Chan-like formless meditations and Nyingthik/Menngagde:

In the Dzogchen textual tradition

Traditionally, Mañjuśrīmitra is said to have classified all the Dzogchen teachings transmitted by his teacher, Garab Dorje, into three series: semdé, Longdé, and menngagdé. Mañjuśrīmitra's student Sri Singha reedited the oral instruction cycle and in this form the teaching was transmitted to Jñānasūtra and Vimalamitra. Vimalamitra is said to have taken the Menngagde teachings to Tibet in the 8th Century.
 
The Glossary for Rangjung Yeshe books described menngagde:

The three series do not represent different schools of Dzogchen practice as much as different approaches. As is common throughout much Buddhist literature, Tibetan Buddhism in particular, the divisions are sometimes said to represent gradations in the faculties of the students for whom the practices are appropriate; practitioners of low, middling, and high faculties, respectively.

Distinguishing features
The distinguishing features of Menngagde are the practices of lhündrup tögal and kadak trekchö.

Another feature of the menngagde is the sādhanā of the Seven Mind Trainings Capriles (2003: p. 103) identifies the sādhanā of the "Seven Lojong".

Four divisions
Menngagde itself is sometimes said to have been further divided by Sri Singha into four categories, called the "Four Cycles of Nyingtig" (Wylie: snying thig skor bzhi). They are the:

Outer Cycle
Inner Cycle
Secret Cycle
Innermost Unexcelled Cycle

Variations of the name of the fourth section include the Secret Heart Essence (gsang ba snying thig), the Most Secret Unexcelled Nyingtig (yang gsang bla na med pa snying tig), the Innermost Unexcelled Cycle of Nyingtig (yang gsang bla na med pa'i snying thig skor), the Most Secret and Unexcelled Great Perfection (yang gsang bla na med pa rdzogs pa chen po), the Most Secret Heart Essence (yang gsang snying thig), the Most Secret Unsurpassable Cycle (yang gsang bla na med pa'i sde) and the Vajra Heart Essence.

Seventeen tantras

This fourth section of menngagde is said to contain the seventeen tantras, although there are eighteen when the Ngagsung Tromay Tantra (focused on protective rites of Ekajati) is added and nineteen including the Longsel Barwey Tantra (Tantra of the Blazing Space of Luminosity).

See also
Semde
Longdé

Notes

References

Print
Norbu, Namkhai and Clemente, Adriano (1999). "The Supreme Source: The Fundamental Tantra of the Dzogchen Semde, Kunjed Gyalpo". Ithaa, New York: Snow Lion Publications. 
Schmidt, Marcia Binder (Ed.) (2002). The Dzogchen Primer:  Embracing The Spiritual Path According To The Great Perfection.  London, Great Britain:  Shambhala Publications, Inc.  (alk. paper)
Tulku Thondup (edited by Harold Talbott) (1989). "The Practice of Dzogchen". Ithaca, NY: Snow Lion Publications.

Electronic
Capriles, Elías (2003). Buddhism and Dzogchen: The Doctrine of the Buddha and the Supreme Vehicle of Tibetan Buddhism. Part One Buddhism: A Dzogchen Outlook. Mérida, Venezuela: dead link (1/22/2013)
Scheidegger, Daniel (2007). "Different Sets of Light-Channels in the Instruction Series of Rdzogs chen" in Revue d’Etudes Tibétaines 
digitalhimalaya.com, accessed: Tuesday January 13, 2009, Deprecated link (12/20/2012)

External links
 Three Sections of Dzogchen

Dzogchen
Nyingma texts
Tibetan words and phrases